Paul Friedländer (March 21, 1882, Berlin – December 10, 1968, Los Angeles) was a German philologist specializing in classical literature.

He studied under Ulrich von Wilamowitz-Moellendorff at the University of Berlin. In 1911 he became a Privatdozent and from 1914 Associate Professor in Berlin, becoming a Professor at Marburg University (1920), University of Halle (1932).  In 1935, the Nazi regime forced him to resign and in 1938 he was detained in a concentration camp. After his release, he came to the United States, where he taught first at and Johns Hopkins University (1939), as a lecturer and at UCLA (1940–1945 as a lecturer, 1945– as a professor).

Works 
 Herakles: Sagengeschichtliche Untersuchungen. Berlin: Weidmann 1907
 Johannes von Gaza und Paulus Silentiarius: Kunstbeschreibungen justinianischer Zeit. Leipzig : Teubner 1912 (Nachdruck: Hildesheim 1969)
 Der grosse Alcibiades Band 1/2  Bonn: Friedrich Cohen 1921/23
 Aufgaben der klassischen Studien an Schule und Universität, 1922 (with Walther Kranz)
 Die griechische Tragödie und das Tragische, 1925–1926
 Platon, 3 vols. Berlin: De Gruyter 1928 ff.
 Plato: An Introduction. Translated by Hans Meyerhoff. 1973.  .
 Athanasius Kircher und Leibniz, 1937.
 Epigrammata. Greek inscriptions in verse. Berkeley: Univ. of California Press, 1948.
 Studien zur antiken Literatur und Kunst. Berlin: De Gruyter 1969

External links 
 https://archive.today/20120306102713/http://www.classics.ukzn.ac.za/reviews/00-03cal.html 
 http://www.pfl.uw.edu.pl/index.php?option=com_content&task=blogcategory&id=78&Itemid=51 
 http://www.britannica.com/eb/article-29312
 http://texts.cdlib.org/view?docId=hb6h4nb3q7&chunk.id=div00016&brand=calisphere&doc.view=entire_text

See also 
 Calder, William M. III and Bernhard Huss (eds), 'The Wilamowitz in Me': 100 Letters between Ulrich von Wilamovitz-Moellendorff and Paul Friedlaender (1904–1931) (Los Angeles: Charles Young Research Library, University of California, 1999). OCLC 464968784.
 Inge Auerbach: Catalogus professorum academiae Marburgensis. Zweiter Band: 1910 bis 1971. Marburg 1979, S. 500–501
 Hans-Georg Gadamer: Paul Friedländer (1882–1968). In: Eikasmós. Band 4 (1993), S. 179–182.
Hans Peter Obermayer: "Vom KZ Sachsenhausen nach Los Angeles – Paul Friedländer". In: id., "Deutsche Altertumswissenschaftler im amerikanischen Exil. Eine Rekonstruktion". Berlin: De Gruyter Berlin 2014, p. 597–672. 
 Walter Tetzlaff: 2000 Kurzbiographien bedeutender deutscher Juden des 20. Jahrhunderts. Lindhorst: Askania 1982, S. 92.
 Deutsche Biographische Enzyklopädie. Band 3, S. 453.

External links
 

1882 births
1968 deaths
Writers from Berlin
People from the Province of Brandenburg
German philologists
University of California, Los Angeles faculty
German male writers
20th-century philologists
Nazi concentration camp survivors
Emigrants from Nazi Germany to the United States